María Luisa Peña (born 16 April 1935) is a Spanish sports shooter. She competed in the women's 25 metre pistol event at the 1984 Summer Olympics.

References

1935 births
Living people
Spanish female sport shooters
Olympic shooters of Spain
Shooters at the 1984 Summer Olympics
Place of birth missing (living people)
20th-century Spanish women